The Elands River is a northward-flowing tributary of the Wilge River, part of the Vaal River basin, South Africa. Its sources are in the Mont-Aux-Sources.

This river is named the Namahadi River in its uppermost section in the area of the Fika-Patso Dam. It flows roughly northwards, through Phuthaditjhaba (Witsieshoek) and joins the left bank of the Wilge River about 27 km northwest of Harrismith.

Formerly this river had been known as Donkin River, after Rufane Shaw Donkin, who administered the Cape Colony from 1820 to 1821.

See also 
 List of rivers in South Africa

References

External links
Free State Region River Systems
Phuthaditjhaba

Drakensberg
Rivers of the Free State (province)